The median-gland Nevada springsnail, scientific name Pyrgulopsis pisteri, is a species of freshwater snails with a gill and an operculum, aquatic gastropod mollusks in the family Hydrobiidae.

This species is endemic to Nevada, United States.

References

Pyrgulopsis
Molluscs of the United States
Endemic fauna of Nevada
Endemic fauna of the United States
Gastropods described in 1987
Taxonomy articles created by Polbot